David Gust (born February 21, 1994) is an American professional ice hockey winger currently playing with the Rockford IceHogs in the American Hockey League (AHL) while under contract to the Chicago Blackhawks of the National Hockey League (NHL).

Playing career

Amateur 

After playing minor hockey for the Chicago Fury the Tier 1 Elite Hockey League (T1EHL), Gust was drafted 99th overall by the Fargo Force in the seventh round of the 2011 United States Hockey League (USHL) Entry Draft.

On November 4, 2011, Gust made his USHL debut in a 4–2 win against the Lincoln Stars. He scored his first USHL goal in a 5–3 loss against the Indiana Ice on November 26, 2011, and finished his debut season with 14 goals and 16 assists in 43 games played. In his sophomore season for the Force, he played in 64 games scoring 21 goals and 28 assists en route to a Clark Cup Final appearance.

Gust played collegiate hockey for the Ohio State Buckeyes in the Big Ten Conference from 2013 to 2017, following the footsteps of his older sister, Kara. During his rookie season, he appeared in 26 games, scoring 6 goals and 4 assists. He played in 25 games with three goals and five assists in his sophomore season and was an Academic All-Big Ten honoree. He improved in his junior season, playing in a career-high 36 games and scoring 11 goals and 25 points, and was named to his second Academic All-Big Ten selection. Before his senior season, Gust was named as an alternate captain for the Buckeyes; he played in 39 games with 18 points and 23 assists and was named to the Big Ten All-Tournament Team.

Professional 

After graduating from Ohio State University, on May 2, 2017, Gust signed with the Bakersfield Condors to a one-year AHL contract. On October 12, 2017, he made his professional hockey league debut in a 5–4 win against the San Antonio Rampage, scoring two goals. He ultimately appeared in 53 games scoring 13 goals and 11 assists, leading the Condors in rookie scoring. On September 4, 2018, he re-signed with the Condors to a one-year AHL contract. Overall, he appeared in 59 games, scoring 18 goals and 15 assists that season.

Prior to the start of the 2019–20 AHL season, he signed with the Charlotte Checkers to a one-year AHL contract, recording 11 goals and 20 assists in 60 games played. On October 16, 2020, the Carolina Hurricanes signed Gust to a one-year, two-way contract. He appeared in 16 games, recording two goals and two assists for the Hurricanes' AHL affiliate, the Chicago Wolves.

Gust re-signed with the Wolves to a one-year AHL contract before the start of the 2021–22 AHL season.

On July 22, 2022, Gust was signed as a free agent to a one-year contract in joining his fourth AHL club, the Rockford IceHogs, affiliate to the Chicago Blackhawks. In the following 2022–23 season, Gust immediately emerged as an offensive presence with the IceHogs, leading the team in scoring with 50 points through 51 games before he was signed to a two-year, two-way contract with the Chicago Blackhawks and immediately recalled to the NHL on February 23, 2023.  In his NHL debut with the Blackhawks, Gust scored his first career NHL goal on his first shift during a 4–3 shootout victory over the San Jose Sharks on February 25.

Personal life 
Gust started skating at the age of 4 after a neighborhood friend introduced him to hockey. He graduated from Marist High School in 2012. At Ohio State University, he majored in Consumer and Family Financial Services.

He has three older sisters, Dana, Jena, and Kara. Kara played collegiate ice hockey for Quinnipiac Bobcats and the Ohio State Buckeyes.

Career statistics

Awards and honors

References

External links 
 

1994 births
Living people
American men's ice hockey right wingers
Bakersfield Condors players
Chicago Blackhawks players
Chicago Wolves players
Charlotte Checkers (2010–) players
Fargo Force players
Ice hockey players from Illinois
Ohio State Buckeyes men's ice hockey players
Rockford IceHogs (AHL) players
Undrafted National Hockey League players